Wawachani (Aymara wawachaña to give birth (animals, women) - ni a suffix, Hispanicized spelling Huahuachani) is a  mountain in the Andes in Bolivia. It is situated in the Oruro Department, Challapata Province, Challapata Municipality. It lies north-west of the mountains Wichhu Qullu and Wila Qullu and east of Thuru.

The river Jach'a Jawira (Aymara for "big river", Jachcha Jahuira) which later is called Kuntur Nasa ("condor nose", Condor Nasa) after it reaches the mountain of the same name originates near Wawachani. It flows to the south-west.

References 

Mountains of Oruro Department